The Best New International Act (also known as Viewer's Choice Best New International Act), is an award presented by BET Awards, to honor prominence international artists from around the world yearly. It was first presented to Sho Madjozi in 2019.

Winners and nominees
Winners are listed first and highlighted in bold.

2010s

2020s

References

BET Awards